David Donaldson MacKinnon (born 23 May 1956) is a Scottish former professional footballer, who played for Dundee, Partick Thistle, Rangers, Airdrieonians, Kilmarnock and Forfar Athletic.

Football career
MacKinnon started his career at Arsenal, although his first-team appearances were confined to testimonial and friendly matches. He returned to Scotland to sign for Dundee at the start of the 1976–77 season, where he played for two seasons. MacKinnon then signed for Partick Thistle for £18,000 at the start of the 1978–79 season. Whilst at Firhill, he earned a Scottish League XI cap versus Northern Ireland in 1980 under Jock Stein. Soon after this, he was diagnosed with tuberculosis and needed a kidney removed; he recovered to full fitness and returned to the Thistle team in January 1981 for a 1980–81 Scottish Cup match versus Clyde.

MacKinnon signed for Rangers for £30,000 in May 1982. He made his Rangers debut on 4 September 1982, at the age of 26, with the match versus Motherwell ending in a 2–2 draw. Rangers – Player by Player, a book written by Bob Ferrier and Robert McElroy described MacKinnon: "Dave was a wholehearted full-back who had pace and was addicted to storming forward to use a powerful shot." MacKinnon departed Ibrox after the arrival of Graeme Souness, moving onto Airdrieonians for the start of the 1986–87 season. He then signed for Kilmarnock at the start of the 1989-90 season and scored the penalty kick versus Cowdenbeath on the final day of that season, to gain promotion from Division Two for the East Ayrshire club.

Post-playing career
After retirement, MacKinnon was appointed general manager at Kilmarnock FC and was then chief executive at Dundee. He was also a reporter for Sportsound on BBC Radio Scotland during the late 1990s. In 2014, MacKinnon became Media and Communications Director at Hamilton Academical before joining Greenock Morton FC as CEO in May 2019.

References

External links

1956 births
Living people
Scottish footballers
Arsenal F.C. players
Rangers F.C. players
Dundee F.C. players
Partick Thistle F.C. players
Airdrieonians F.C. (1878) players
Kilmarnock F.C. players
Forfar Athletic F.C. players
Scottish Football League players
Scottish Football League representative players
Association football defenders
Dundee F.C. non-playing staff
Hamilton Academical F.C. non-playing staff
Kilmarnock F.C. non-playing staff